Maussane-les-Alpilles (provençal: Maussano lis Aupiho) is a commune in the Bouches-du-Rhône department in the Provence-Alpes-Cote d'Azur region in southern France.

Geography
The commune of Maussane-les-Alpilles is situated on the southern slopes of the Alpilles in the heart of the Natural Regional Park of the Alpilles. It is bound by the rocky ridges and crests of the Entreconque on the North and the north rim of the Crau on the South.

Population

See also
 Communes of the Bouches-du-Rhône department

References

Communes of Bouches-du-Rhône
Bouches-du-Rhône communes articles needing translation from French Wikipedia